Charlie Hong Kong is an Asian restaurant located on Soquel Avenue in Santa Cruz, California.

Description
Charlie Hong Kong opened for business in 1998 and was acquired by the current owners, Carolyn and Rudy Rudolph, a year later in 1999. The restaurant was named after its first chef, Charlie Deal and Hong Kong and serves Southeast Asian cuisine mixed with local produce sourced from Lakeside Organic Gardens in Watsonville such as noodle and rice bowls, soups and salads. As of December 2, 2019, Charlie Hong Kong served 500 people daily.

Reception
In July 2020, Good Times put "The Spices of Charlie Hong Kong" on its list of the 25 best things about outdoor dining and takeout in Santa Cruz and highlighted its "Green Curry Noodles" for their "complex" blend of cilantro, coconut and chile flavors and the "amazing" tamarind sauce on the pad thai.

References

Companies based in Santa Cruz, California
Restaurants established in 1998
1998 establishments in California
Restaurants in California
American Chinese cuisine